Harbor City Restaurant is a Chinese restaurant in Seattle, in the U.S. state of Washington.

Description 
The restaurant serves dim sum; the menu has included chicken feet, Chinese broccoli, egg tarts, har gow, Peking duck, shumai, and turnip cakes. According to Northwest Asian Weekly, "Harbor City is popular among the young and old for dinner and lunch."

History 

Harbor City was founded in 1988 by the Ngo family, who ran the restaurant until its closure in 2008. Han Ma is the restaurant's owner.

Reception 
In 2013, Julia Wayne of Eater Seattle wrote, "Dim sum, and the offerings at Harbor City are among the best in town. With plenty of salty, sweet, meaty, bite-sized delights, even the more indecisive among us can find satisfaction." The website's Leonardo David Raymundo and Ryan Lee included Harbor City in a 2021 list of "14 Delightful Dim Sum Restaurants in the Seattle Area".

See also 

 History of Chinese Americans in Seattle
 List of Chinese restaurants

References

External links 

 

Chinese restaurants in Seattle